"High Life" is a Top 10 single from UK band Modern Romance. It was released in 1983 by WEA as a 7-inch picture disc and a 12-inch single. A Japanese and German edition was also released.

Formats

7-inch single
High Life
You Just Can't Kill The Beat

12-inch single
High Life
You Just Can't Kill The Beat
Band of Gold (Freda Payne song) [cover]

7-inch picture disc
High Life (Michael J. Mullins photo)
You Just Can't Kill The Beat (David Jaymes Photo)

Chart position
UK Singles Chart #8

History
High Life (1982) was the third Top 10 single for Modern Romance (band). It was the second single to feature Michael J. Mullins as lead vocalist and peaked at #8 on the UK chart in 1983. The single can be found on Modern Romance's two hit albums, Trick of the Light (1983) and Party Tonight (1983). It also made an appearance on their farewell single, Best Mix of Our Lives (1985) with four other singles: Best Years of Our Lives (1982 song), Don't Stop That Crazy Rhythm, Everybody Salsa, and Ay Ay Ay Ay Moosey. The 12-inch vinyl came with a special fold-out poster of Michael J. Mullins and David Jaymes.

The 12-inch B-side, Band of Gold (Freda Payne song), is a cover version, which also features on the Modern Romance compilation albums Party Tonight (1983) and Modern Romance: The Platinum Collection (2006). High Life was written by Modern Romance founder member, David Jaymes. It can also be found on the Japanese compilation, Juanita (1983).

Personnel
Michael J. Mullins - vocals
David Jaymes - bass guitar
Robbie Jaymes - synthesizer
Paul Gendler - guitar
John Du Prez - trumpet
Andy Kyriacou - drums
Tony Visconti - producer (music)

References

1983 singles
Modern Romance (band) songs
Song recordings produced by Tony Visconti
1983 songs
Warner Music Group singles
Songs written by John Du Prez